The Night Before is a 2015 American Christmas comedy stoner film directed by Jonathan Levine and written by Levine, Evan Goldberg, Kyle Hunter, and Ariel Shaffir. The film stars Joseph Gordon-Levitt, Seth Rogen, and Anthony Mackie as three childhood friends who annually reunite on Christmas Eve in search of the best party in New York City. Lizzy Caplan, Jillian Bell, Mindy Kaling, and Michael Shannon also star.

Principal photography began on August 11, 2014, in New York City. Good Universe and Point Grey Pictures produced the film, which Columbia Pictures released in North America on November 20, 2015. The film received mixed reviews from critics and grossed $52 million worldwide.

Plot
In December 2001, Ethan Miller loses his parents in a car accident. His best friends Isaac Greenberg and Chris Roberts resolve to spend every Christmas Eve with him so that he will not be alone. The three learn about the exclusive Nutcracker Ball party but are unable to find it.

They continue their collective holiday tradition for many years until 2015, when they finally decide to end the tradition. Chris, now a famous football player, and Isaac, married with a baby on the way, worry that Ethan, a struggling musician working dead-end jobs, is not ready for the tradition to end.

At work, Ethan steals tickets to the Nutcracker Ball. Before embarking on their last Christmas Eve together, the friends meet at Isaac's house, where his pregnant wife, Betsy, gives him various illegal drugs, including magic mushrooms and cocaine.

The friends stop first at the Rockefeller Center Christmas Tree, where Ethan reveals the tickets to the ball. In an attempt to impress his teammates, Chris purchases marijuana from their former high school dealer, Mr. Green.

At a karaoke bar, the friends run into Diana, who recently broke up with Ethan due to his failure to commit, and her friend Sarah, both of whom are also attending the Nutcracker Ball. Isaac, affected by the drugs he took, records a video phone message confessing that he is terrified of having a child. Chris hooks up with a supposed fan who steals his marijuana.

The friends contact Mr. Green again, who meets them at Chris' mother's, where they have dinner. She encourages Ethan to make up with Diana, and Isaac realizes he has accidentally switched phones with Sarah when he begins to receive sexts. While they search for Isaac's phone, the thief steals Chris' marijuana again.

The friends split up, as Chris wants his marijuana back, Isaac wants his phone, and Ethan wants to go to the party. Chris fails to recover his marijuana but through the thief learns the true value of his friends. Isaac, hallucinating from a mixture of drugs, meets his wife and her family and vomits during Midnight Mass. Ethan is beaten by two drunk pub crawling men dressed as Santa after defending the spirit of Christmas.

Meeting back at a subway station, the tension between the friends explodes as Ethan reveals that he and Isaac know Chris' sudden success is due to steroids, and Chris reveals that he and Isaac think Ethan is lost.

Despite their revelations, the friends go to the Nutcracker Ball. Chris learns that his teammates did not need the marijuana he struggled to obtain, and mock him for a video shot earlier with his friends. Isaac retrieves his phone, learning Sarah never revealed his video message. Ethan finds Diana and spontaneously proposes to her in front of the entire party with Miley Cyrus. While she accepts publicly, she declines in private, saying that he only proposed out of fear of losing his friends.

Ashamed, Ethan goes to the roof where he finds Mr. Green, who reveals that he is the creator and host of the Nutcracker Ball. After experiencing a memory of his friends initiating their yearly ritual, Ethan rejoins Chris and Isaac, who have been thrown out after an altercation with Chris' teammates.

As morning dawns, the friends reconcile just as Isaac receives a message that Betsy is in labor. Rushing to the hospital in Mr. Green's car, they discover it was a false alarm. Mr. Green is revealed to be an angel, helping the friends in order to earn his wings. Isaac shows his wife the video, and she admits she is also scared about raising their daughter.

The trio spend Christmas at Isaac's, after which Chris has dinner with his mother and admits to his steroid use. Ethan goes to Diana's, where he apologizes for his behavior and not being ready to commit. Admitting that she has missed him, Diana accepts his request to finally meet her parents.

One year later, the friends and their loved ones spend Christmas together. Isaac's baby cannot sleep, so the trio serenade her.

Cast

Production

Development
On February 10, 2014, it was announced that Seth Rogen and Joseph Gordon-Levitt would reunite in the film, following 50/50, in which they co-starred. On May 13, Anthony Mackie joined the cast. Jonathan Levine, director of 50/50, directed The Night Before from his own script. Good Universe and Point Grey Pictures produced the film, which Sony's Columbia Pictures distributed.

Casting
On August 7, Jillian Bell was cast to play Betsy, the wife of Rogen's character. On August 8, Lizzy Caplan joined the cast to play Diana, a love interest of Gordon-Levitt's character.

Filming
Principal photography on the film began on August 11, 2014, in New York City. On August 14, filming took place around 112th street and Broadway in NYC. On August 22, Rogen was spotted filming scenes outside a church in Manhattan. On January 5, 2015, filming took place in and around Rockefeller Center, where the crews were taking some shots of the Rockefeller Center Christmas Tree.

Release
The film was originally scheduled to be released on December 11, 2015, but Sony moved the release date to November 25, 2015, and later to November 20, 2015.

Box office
The Night Before grossed $43 million in North America and $9.3 million in other territories for a worldwide total of $52.4 million, against a budget of $25 million.

In the United States, The Night Before opened alongside The Hunger Games: Mockingjay – Part 2 and Secret in Their Eyes on November 20, 2015. The film made $550,000 from its Thursday preview screenings and $3.6 million on its first day. In its opening weekend, the film grossed $9.9 million, and finished fourth at the box office behind Mockingjay – Part 2 ($102.7 million), Spectre ($15 million) and The Peanuts Movie ($13.2 million). During its second week, the film grossed $8.4 million (a drop of 15.2%), finishing 6th at the box office.

Critical response
The site's critical consensus reads, "The Night Before provokes enough belly laughs to qualify as a worthwhile addition to the list of Christmas comedies worth revisiting, even if it isn't quite as consistent as the classics." On Metacritic, the film has a weighted average score of 58 out of 100, based on 31 critics, indicating "mixed or average reviews". Audiences polled by CinemaScore gave the film an average grade of "A−" on an A+ to F scale.

See also
 List of Christmas films

References

External links
 
 
 
 
 The Night Before at ComingSoon.net

2015 films
American films about cannabis
2010s English-language films
2010s buddy comedy films
American Christmas comedy films
American buddy comedy films
Films about Christianity
Films about drugs
Films about parties
Films directed by Jonathan Levine
Films set in 2001
Films set in 2008
Films set in 2015
Films set in 2016
Films set in 2033
Films set in Brooklyn
Films set in Manhattan
Films shot in New York City
Point Grey Pictures films
Columbia Pictures films
Films scored by Marco Beltrami
Films produced by Seth Rogen
2010s Christmas comedy films
2015 comedy films
Films produced by Evan Goldberg
Films with screenplays by Evan Goldberg
Hanukkah films
2010s American films
English-language comedy films